Senator Hayden may refer to:

Carl Hayden (1877–1972), U.S. Senator from Arizona from 1927 to 1969
Jeff Hayden (born 1966), Minnesota State Senate
Moses Hayden (1786–1830), New York State Senate
Salter Hayden, Canadian Senator for Toronto, Ontario, from 1940 to 1983
Tom Hayden (1939–2016), California State Senate